Liudmyla Olehivna Kuklinovska (born 4 January 1998) is a Ukrainian canoeist. She is champion of the 2019 European Games in Minsk

References 

1998 births
Living people
Ukrainian female canoeists
European Games medalists in canoeing
Canoeists at the 2019 European Games
European Games gold medalists for Ukraine
Canoeists at the 2020 Summer Olympics
Olympic canoeists of Ukraine
21st-century Ukrainian women